Blida is a village in Marjeyoun District in southern Lebanon.

Location
The municipality of Blida is located in the Kaza of Marjaayoun one of is one of the eight mohafazats (governorates) of Lebanon. Blida is 118 kilometers (73.3252 mi) away from Beirut, the capital of Lebanon. Its elevation is 630 meters (2067.03 ft - 688.968 yd) above sea level. Blida surface stretches for 1330 hectares (13.3 km² - 5.1338 mi²) .

Name
E. H. Palmer wrote that the name Belidet meant "The little village".

History
In 1881, the PEF's Survey of Western Palestine (SWP) described it as: "A village, built of stone, containing mosque, and having about 150 Moslem inhabitants, situated on a ridge, with figs, olives, and arable land. One cistern and a good spring one mile south-east of the village give the water supply."

They further noted: "Here are several columns and remains of ruins. Double triangles are cut on either side of door of mosque."

Educational establishments

References

Bibliography

External links
 Blida Localliban: Centre de resource sur le developpement local
Survey of Western Palestine, Map 4: IAA, Wikimedia commons

Populated places in the Israeli security zone 1985–2000
Populated places in Marjeyoun District